
Gmina Ozorków is a rural gmina (administrative district) in Zgierz County, Łódź Voivodeship, in central Poland. Its seat is the town of Ozorków, although the town is not part of the territory of the gmina.

Villages
Gmina Ozorków contains the villages and settlements of Aleksandria, Boczki, Borszyn, Cedrowice, Cedrowice-Parcela, Celestynów, Czerchów, Dybówka, Helenów, Katarzynów, Konary, Leśmierz, Małachowice, Małachowice-Kolonia, Maszkowice, Modlna, Muchówka, Opalanki, Ostrów, Parzyce, Pełczyska, Sierpów, Skotniki, Skromnica, Śliwniki, Sokolniki, Sokolniki-Las, Sokolniki-Parcela, Solca Mała, Solca Wielka, Tkaczew, Tymienica and Wróblew.

Neighbouring gminas
Gmina Ozorków is bordered by the town of Ozorków and by the gminas of Góra Świętej Małgorzaty, Łęczyca, Parzęczew and Zgierz.

References
Polish official population figures 2006

Ozorkow
Zgierz County